Jonathan 'Jon' Bryant (born 14 October 1976, in Aberdare, Wales) is a former Wales Rugby union international. His previous clubs include Pontypridd RFC, Celtic Warriors, Newport Gwent Dragons and Sale Sharks. Formerly the player/manager of Merthyr RFC and head coach of Barry RFC.

Before becoming seriously involved in the world of rugby, Jonathan was a talented footballer who was scouted by many professional clubs before switching codes after an invite to play for his old school, Aberdare Boys Comprehensive, against a select XV. This game would include his future teammate, Dale McIntosh.

Such was his enthusiasm and drive in the game, he was offered a trial by the then Merthyr Tydfil RFC manager (He was also offered a bet by his uncle that if he "dump-tackled" McIntosh he would be financially rewarded and make a talking point in the game few would have anticipated). After two years at Merthyr, Bryant was offered a trial with Pontypridd along with Robert Sidoli, and he scored a try on his debut against Llanelli RFC.

He attained his only international cap as a replacement against Romania on 27 August 2003.

References

External links
Newport Gwent Dragons profile

1976 births
Living people
Rugby union centres
Wales international rugby union players
Welsh rugby union players
Sale Sharks players
Dragons RFC players
Pontypridd RFC players
Rugby union players from Aberdare
Merthyr RFC players